Irina Ivanovna Tolkunova (born June 2, 1971 in Moscow) is a Russian-Kazakhstani water polo player who competed  in the 2000 Summer Olympics for Russia and in the 2004 Summer Olympics for Kazakhstan.

In 2000, she won the bronze medal with the Russian team.

Four years later she was part of the Kazakhstani team which was eliminated in the first round.

See also
 List of Olympic medalists in water polo (women)

External links
 

1971 births
Living people
Sportspeople from Moscow
Soviet female water polo players
Russian female water polo players
Kazakhstani female water polo players
Olympic water polo players of Russia
Olympic water polo players of Kazakhstan
Water polo players at the 2000 Summer Olympics
Water polo players at the 2004 Summer Olympics
Olympic bronze medalists for Russia
Olympic medalists in water polo
Medalists at the 2000 Summer Olympics
Russian emigrants to Kazakhstan